Davaasürengiin Oyuuntuyaa (born 29 July 1966) is a Mongolian gymnast. She competed in five events at the 1980 Summer Olympics.

References

1966 births
Living people
Mongolian female artistic gymnasts
Olympic gymnasts of Mongolia
Gymnasts at the 1980 Summer Olympics
Place of birth missing (living people)
20th-century Mongolian women